Geophilus smithi is a species of soil centipede in the family Geophilidae found in Washington, D.C. It grows up to 28 millimeters in length, has 49 leg pairs (in female specimens), 25-30 coxal pores, and coxae of prehensorial legs of about equal length and width.

Taxonomy
In its original description, G. smithi was compared to G. huronicus (now Arenophilus bipuncticeps). G. smithi was possibly based upon specimens of G. ampyx and may even be a senior synonym, though this is not confirmed.

References 

smithi
Animals described in 1889
Arthropods of North America
Taxa named by Charles Harvey Bollman